Sean John is a privately held fashion lifestyle company created by music mogul Sean Combs. The line made its fashion debut with a men's sportswear collection for the spring 1998 season.
Individuals of note who have represented the brand in advertising and marketing include Combs himself, musicians Nelly, T.I., Mariah Carey, Nas, Fabolous, Dolla, Usher, Pharrell Williams, Mary J. Blige, Rick Ross, Mack Wilds, and Busta Rhymes; actors Lauren London, Cassie Ventura, Jamie Foxx, Penélope Cruz, Jussie Smollett, and Vincent Pastore; athlete Dwyane Wade; fashion models Tyson Beckford, Naomi Campbell, Channing Tatum, and many notable DJs.

History

In 1999 Sean Combs launched a signature collection of sportswear under his given name, Sean John. Since its launch, Sean John has enjoyed critical and commercial success with revenues now exceeding $525 million annually. Sean John has often appeared at the award ceremony for the Council of Fashion Designers of America (CFDA) held annually in New York. For five consecutive years, from 2000 to 2005, Sean John was nominated for its excellence in design. In 2004, Sean John was awarded the CFDA Men's Designer of the Year award.

In February 2001, Sean John produced the first nationally televised runway show during   New York Fashion Week when it simultaneously aired live on E! Television and the Style Network. During fashion week in February 2002, the New York Times ran a front page story on Sean John.

In 2004, Sean John invested in the high-end label Zac Posen.

In October 2008, the company purchased streetwear lifestyle brand Enyce from Liz Claiborne for $20 million.

Combs' FIFI Award-winning fragrance, Unforgivable, was joined by Sean John fragrance I AM KING in November 2008. On November 24, 2008, he unveiled a new Times Square billboard for the I Am King line to replace his iconic Sean John ad.

In May 2010, Sean John made a distribution agreement with Macy's department store in which Macy's and Macys.com would be the sole distributor of Sean John sportswear at the retail and online level.  As part of this agreement, Sean John and Macy's expanded the Sean John brand's distribution to many more Macy's stores and entered into exclusive marketing partnerships with the NBA.

In recent years, Sean John has expanded to a full lifestyle brand with the inclusion of multiple product categories including sportswear, tailored suiting, dress shirts, ties, hosiery, eyewear, childrenswear,  fragrances, time pieces, outerwear, underwear, loungewear, cold weather accessories, headwear, and footwear.

After having previously sold a 90% stake in Sean John to Global Brands Group in 2016, in December 2021, Sean Combs purchased Sean John back from Global Brands Group for $7.5 million, following the company's bankruptcy.

References

External links
Official website

Clothing companies of the United States
Clothing companies established in 1998
Sean John
Shops in New York City
Hip hop fashion
Eyewear brands of the United States